Galore may refer to:

Albums
 Galore (The Cure album), 1997
 Galore (Dragonette album), 2007
 Galore (Kirsty MacColl album), 1995
 Galore (The Primitives album), 1991
 Galore (Thumpers album), 2014

Other uses
 Galore (novel), a 2009 novel by Michael Crummey
 Galore (film), a 2013 Australian drama film
 Galore, New South Wales, a village in Australia

See also
 Galore Galore, a 2007 album by alternative rock band Sponge
 Pussy Galore, a character in James Bond novels and films